Namhae County (Namhae-gun) is a county in South Gyeongsang Province, South Korea.

Demographics 

As of 2005, Namhae had a population of 54,392. However, Namhae has witnessed an aging and decreasing population, having had a population of 137,914 in 1964.

Administrative divisions
Namhae-gun is divided into 1 eup and 9 myeon.
Namhae-eup
Changseon-myeon
Gohyeon-myeon
Idong-myeon
Mijo-myeon
Nam-myeon
Samdong-myeon
Sangju-myeon
Seo-myeon
Seolcheon-myeon

Namhae in popular culture 
The fictional character Jin-Soo Kwon (portrayed by Daniel Dae Kim) on the ABC television show Lost is from Namhae.
Korean Drama "Couple or Trouble" aka "Fantasy Couple" was set in Namhae. The German village Dogil Maeul and Hilton Namhae Golf Spa were featured.
The 2009 documentary “Home from Home” (Endstation der Sehnsüchte), directed by Cho Sung-hyung, was filmed in the German Village Dogil Maeul (독일 마을).
In the 2017 Korean drama "Because This is My First Life", female lead Yoon Ji-ho (portrayed by Jung So-min) is from Namhae. The cast reportedly shot some scenes there.
The fictional character Prosecutor Hwang Si-Mok is transferred to Namhae county at the end of the first season of the drama series Stranger (2017)
Season 2 of Stranger (2020) kicks off with the fictional character Prosecutor Hwang Si-Mok in the Namhae office.
In episode 14 of True Beauty, the protagonists come to Namhae-gun without imagining that they would be the last time together.

Notable people
Choi San from the kpop boy group ATEEZ is from Namhae. He was selected as Namhae's Public Relations Ambassador in 2021.

Geography

Namhae county covers an area of 357 km2, covering the main islands of Namhae and Changseon, the smaller islands of Jodo, Hodo and Nodo, and 65 other uninhabited islets.

Namhae county also features several peaks; Mangun (786m), Geum (681m), and Won (627m), all of which are located on Namhae island.

Climate

Sister cities
Namhae is twinned with:

  Ganghwa, South Korea 
  Geumcheon-gu, South Korea 
  Dongdaemun-gu, South Korea 
  Gimhae, South Korea 
  Busanjin-gu, South Korea 
  Hampyeong, South Korea 
  Isa, Japan 
  Dunhuang, China 
  Yiyang, China 
  Jinggangshan, China 
  Nordfriesland, Germany

See also
 Namhae Waesong
Memorial Hall for the U.S. Airmen Killed In Action During World War II

References

External links
County government website
http://www.namhae.go.kr/

 
Counties of South Gyeongsang Province